Metatrichoniscoides celticus is a species of woodlouse in the family Trichoniscidae. It is found only on maritime cliffs in the Vale of Glamorgan from Ogmore-by-Sea to St. Donat's, and is considered near threatened because of its small population.

See also
List of woodlice of the British Isles

References

Woodlice
Endemic fauna of Wales
Environment of the Vale of Glamorgan
Woodlice of Europe
Taxonomy articles created by Polbot
Crustaceans described in 1981